Joseph Barnes Borton (1832 – 24 February 1924) was a New Zealand goldfields warden and cricketer. Along with William Gilbert Rees, Gibson Turton, James Fulton, and John Kissling, he is credited with reviving interest in cricket in Otago in the 1860s.

Life and career
Borton was born in England and moved to New Zealand in 1854. He was a miner at Waitahuna in the Otago goldfields in the early 1860s. 

In February 1864, Borton was one of the umpires for the match played at the Recreation Reserve, Dunedin, between the touring English cricket team and an Otago team of 22 players. Borton played in two first-class matches for Otago in 1865 and 1866. The matches Borton played in between Otago and Canterbury are regarded as the second and third games of first-class cricket within New Zealand, and the first games with teams composed entirely of local players. An obituary of Borton in The Press in 1924 suggests that the results of these matches were determined as much by the travelling conditions for the visiting team as by cricketing merit: the Canterbury side that lost to Borton's Otago team in 1866 had taken two days to travel by ship from Christchurch to Dunedin and the 1924 newspaper quotes a contemporary report that, on part of the journey, "it was found that the steamer, though going full steam ahead, had actually been driven some miles backwards". Borton was a left-arm bowler and left-handed batsman. 

Borton was appointed as a warden and resident magistrate in the Otago Gold Fields district, and receiver of gold revenue at Roxburgh in 1870, having previously served as gold receiver at the Hamilton diggings near Ranfurly. He later served on the Tuapeka county council, representing the Clarks Riding district: he was first elected in December 1881, an earlier election having resulted in a dead-heat. He resigned as a justice of the peace in 1890. In 1894, Borton was elected as one of eight members of the licensing committee for the Caversham licensing district in Dunedin. In later years he worked for the Public Works Department in Dunedin.

Borton married Eleanor Conroy at Cottenham, in Central Otago, in April 1881. He died at his home in Dunedin on 24 February 1924, aged 91. He was buried at the Dunedin Northern Cemetery, with the Reverend Ernest Blamires, known as "The Cricketing Cleric", officiating.

See also
 List of Otago representative cricketers

References

External links
 

1832 births
1924 deaths
New Zealand cricketers
Otago cricketers
People from Warwickshire
Local politicians in New Zealand
English emigrants to New Zealand
Burials at Dunedin Northern Cemetery
New Zealand justices of the peace
Settlers of Otago